Castione-Arbedo railway station is a railway station in the Swiss canton of Ticino and municipality of Arbedo-Castione. The station is on the Swiss Federal Railways Gotthard railway, between Biasca and Bellinzona.

From 1907, Castione-Arbedo station was the principal interchange point between the Gotthard railway and the Bellinzona–Mesocco railway (BM), a metre gauge railway linking Bellinzona and various communities in the Val Mesolcina as far as Mesocco. The line closed to passenger traffic in 1972, and to freight traffic in 2003, but the section north as far as Cama, operated as the Ferrovia Mesolcinese tourist line until its final closure in 2013.

Services 
 the following services stop at Castione-Arbedo:

 : half-hourly service to Locarno.

The station is also served by bus services operated by Autopostale, including an hourly service between Bellinzona and Airolo that parallels the railway line.

References

External links 
 
 

Railway stations in Ticino
Swiss Federal Railways stations